The 2013 ATP World Tour was the global elite professional tennis circuit organized by the Association of Tennis Professionals (ATP) for the 2013 tennis season. The 2013 ATP World Tour calendar comprises the Grand Slam tournaments (supervised by the International Tennis Federation (ITF)), the ATP World Tour Masters 1000, the ATP World Tour 500 series, the ATP World Tour 250 series, the Davis Cup (organized by the ITF) and the ATP World Tour Finals. Also included in the 2013 calendar is the Hopman Cup, which was organized by the ITF and does not distribute ranking points.

Schedule 

This is the complete schedule of events on the 2013 calendar, with player progression documented from the quarterfinals stage.

Key

January

February

March

April

May

June

July

August

September

October

November

Statistical information
These tables present the number of singles (S), doubles (D), and mixed doubles (X) titles won by each player and each nation during the season, within all the tournament categories of the 2013 ATP World Tour: the Grand Slam tournaments, the ATP World Tour Finals, the ATP World Tour Masters 1000, the ATP World Tour 500 series, and the ATP World Tour 250 series. The players/nations are sorted by:
 Total number of titles (a doubles title won by two players representing the same nation counts as only one win for the nation);
 Cumulated importance of those titles (one Grand Slam win equalling two Masters 1000 wins, one ATP World Tour Finals win equalling one-and-a-half Masters 1000 win, one Masters 1000 win equalling two 500 events wins, one 500 event win equalling two 250 events wins);
 A singles, doubles, mixed-doubles hierarchy;
 Alphabetical order (by family names for players).

Key

Titles won by player

Titles won by nation

Titles information
The following players won their first main circuit title in singles, doubles, or mixed doubles:
Singles
 Bernard Tomic – Sydney (draw)
 Horacio Zeballos – Viña del Mar (draw)
 Lukáš Rosol – Bucharest (draw)
 Nicolas Mahut – 's-Hertogenbosch (draw)
 Carlos Berlocq – Båstad (draw)
 Fabio Fognini – Stuttgart (draw)
 João Sousa – Kuala Lumpur (draw)
 Grigor Dimitrov – Stockholm (draw)
Doubles
 Benoît Paire – Chennai (draw)
 Paolo Lorenzi – Viña del Mar (draw)
 Frank Moser – San Jose (draw)
 Jack Sock – Delray Beach (draw)
 John Peers – Houston (draw)
 Raven Klaasen – Nice (draw)
 Facundo Bagnis – Stuttgart (draw)
 Thomaz Bellucci – Stuttgart (draw)
 Nicholas Monroe – Båstad (draw)
 Simon Stadler – Båstad (draw)
 Purav Raja – Bogotá (draw)
 Divij Sharan – Bogotá (draw)
 Martin Kližan – Umag (draw)
 Igor Sijsling – Atlanta (draw)
 Ivan Dodig – Shanghai (draw)
 Mikhail Elgin – Moscow (draw)
 Denis Istomin – Moscow (draw)
 Florin Mergea – Vienna (draw)
Mixed doubles
 Matthew Ebden – Australian Open (draw)
 František Čermák – French Open (draw)

The following players defended a main circuit title in singles, doubles, or mixed doubles:
Singles
 David Ferrer – Auckland (draw), Buenos Aires (draw)
 Andy Murray – Brisbane (draw)
 Novak Djokovic – Australian Open (draw), Beijing (draw), Shanghai (draw), ATP World Tour Finals (draw)
 Milos Raonic – San Jose (draw)
 Rafael Nadal – Barcelona (draw), Rome (draw), French Open (draw)
 Juan Martín del Potro – Basel (draw)
Doubles
 Bob Bryan – Sydney (draw)
 Mike Bryan – Sydney (draw)
 Nenad Zimonjić – Rotterdam (draw)
 Bruno Soares – São Paulo (draw)
 Xavier Malisse – San Jose (draw)
 Mahesh Bhupathi – Dubai (draw)
 David Marrero – Acapulco (draw), Umag (draw)
 Horia Tecău – Bucharest (draw)

ATP rankings
These are the ATP rankings of the top 20 singles players, doubles players, and the top 10 doubles teams on the ATP Tour, at the current date of the 2013 season. Players on a gold background have qualified for the Year-End Championships.

Singles

Number 1 ranking

Doubles

Number 1 ranking

Prize money leaders

Statistics leaders

Best matches by atptour.com

Best 5 Grand Slam matches

Best 5 ATP World Tour matches

Point distribution

Glossary
1 Wild cards who lose at their first round matches at Grand Slam and ATP World Tour Masters 1000 events are not awarded ranking points.

2 Only applicable to the Wimbledon Championships, which is the only tournament in the entire ATP World Tour to feature a qualifying stage for doubles.

3 Any player who reaches the second round of a tournament by drawing a bye and then loses is given first round loser's points.

Retirements
Following is a list of notable players (winners of a main tour title, and/or part of the ATP rankings top 100 (singles) or top 50 (doubles) for at least one week) who announced their retirement from professional tennis, became inactive (after not playing for more than 52 weeks), or were permanently banned from playing, during the 2013 season:

 Igor Andreev (born 14 July 1983 in Moscow, Russia) turned professional in 2002, and peaked at No. 18 in singles in 2008 and No. 59 in doubles in 2005. He won three singles titles on the main tour, as well as one doubles titles. Andreev reached one Grand Slam doubles es quarterfinal in his career at 2007 French Open. He was active part of the Russia Davis Cup team for 15 times between 2004 and 2012. He announced his retirement after several injuries, that compromised his career.
 James Blake (born 28 December 1979 in Yonkers, United States) turned professional in 1999, and peaked at No. 4 in singles in 2006 and No. 31 in doubles in 2003, making the year-end ATP rankings singles Top Ten twice (2006, 2008). The American won ten singles titles on the main tour, as well as seven doubles titles (including one Masters trophy). Blake reached three Grand Slam quarterfinals in his career, two at the US Open (2005, 2006), and one at the Australian Open (2008), made one final at the Shanghai year-end championships (2006, lost to Federer), and also played the Olympic Bronze medal match at the Beijing Olympics (2008, lost to Djokovic). Part of the United States Davis Cup team for 17 ties between 2001 and 2009, Blake took part in one victorious campaign (2007, def. Russia). He announced his last tournament would be the 2013 US Open in August.
 Igor Kunitsyn (born 30 September 1981 in Vladivostok, Russia) turned professional in 1999, and peaked at no. 35 in singles in 2009 and no. 49 in doubles in 2008. He won one single title on the main tour, as well as one doubles title. He was also a part of the Russia Davis Cup team for 8 ties between 2008 and 2013. He last played at the 2013 US Open – Men's singles qualifying in August.
 Xavier Malisse (born 19 July 1980 in Kortrijk, Belgium) turned professional in 1998, and peaked at no. 19 in singles in 2002 and no. 25 in doubles in 2011. The Belgian, named X-Man, won three singles titles on the main tour, as well as nine doubles titles (including one Grand Slam title). Malisse Grand Slam final was winning the 2004 French Open doubles with fellow Belgian Olivier Rochus. He was also part of the Belgium Davis Cup team for 15 ties between 1998 and 2013.
 Nicolás Massú (born 10 October 1979 in Viña del Mar, Chile) turned professional in 1997, and peaked at No. 9 in singles in 2004 and No. 31 in doubles in 2005. He won six singles titles on the main tour, as well as one doubles titles. His major winning was the double olympic gold at 2004 Olympic Games in singles and doubles, the only man in the open era to win both at the same event. Massú reached one Grand Slam doubles semifinals in his career at 2005 French Open, made one final at the Madrid Masters 2003, lost to Ferrero. He was active part of the Chile Davis Cup team for 15 ties between 1996 and 2011. He announced his retirement after several injuries, that compromised his career.
 Ricardo Mello (born 21 December 1980 in Campinas, Brazil) joined the pro tour in 1999, reached the singles no. 50 spot in 2005, and the doubles no. 118 ranking in the same year. He decided to retire after the 2013 Brasil Open, where he lost in the first round to Martín Alund.
 David Nalbandian (born 1 January 1982 in Unquillo, Argentina) turned professional in 2000, and peaked at no. 3 in singles in 2006 and no. 105 in doubles in 2009. He won 11 singles titles on the main tour. His major goals were the single final at 2002 Wimbledon Championships, where he lost to Lleyton Hewitt and the 2005 Tennis Masters Cup trophy, which he won over Roger Federer. Nalbandian reached four Grand Slam singles semifinals in his career at the 2006 Australian Open, the 2004 French Open and the 2006 French Open, and the 2003 US Open. He was active part of the Argentina Davis Cup team for 26 ties between 2002 and 2013. He announced his retirement after several injuries that compromised his career.
 Iván Navarro (born 19 October 1981 in Alicante, Spain) joined the pro tour in 2001, reached the singles no. 67 spot in 2009, and the doubles no. 127 ranking in March 1999. Lately, he fell out of the top 250. He was known for his unique relentless serve and volley. He decided to end up with the tennis career at the 2013 Open Prévadiès Saint–Brieuc, where he lost in the first round to Dominik Meffert.
 Dick Norman (born 1 March 1971 in Waregem, Belgium) joined the pro tour in 1991, reached the singles no. 85 spot in 2006, and the doubles no. 10 ranking in April 2010. His major goal was the 2009 French Open doubles final in pair with Wesley Moodie, but they lost against Lukáš Dlouhý and Leander Paes. He decided to retire after competing at the 2013 Topshelf Open, where he lost in the first round in pair with fellow Belgian David Goffin, at the age of 42.

Comebacks

Following are notable players who will comeback after retirements during the 2013 ATP Tour season:
  Jonas Björkman (born 23 March 1972, in Alvesta, Sweden), turned professional in 1991. Former world No. 4 in singles and No. 1 doubles. 10-time Grand Slam champion (10 in doubles). Holds 6 singles & 54 doubles titles.
 Joachim Johansson (born 1 July 1982 in Lund, Sweden), turned professional in 2000. He reached the semi-finals of the 2004 US Open and achieved a career-high singles ranking of World No. 9.
  Rogier Wassen (born 9 August 1976 in Roermond, Netherlands), turned professional in 1994. He reached the quarterfinals-finals of the 2007 Australian Open and achieved a career-high doubles ranking of World No. 24.

See also

2013 WTA Tour
2013 ATP Challenger Tour
2013 ITF Women's Circuit
2013 ITF Men's Circuit
Association of Tennis Professionals
International Tennis Federation

References

External links
Association of Tennis Professionals (ATP) World Tour official website
International Tennis Federation (ITF) official website
Interactive Map of 2013 ATP tournaments

 
ATP World Tour
ATP Tour seasons